Clos du Doubs is a municipality in the district of Porrentruy in the canton of Jura in Switzerland. It was founded on January 1, 2009 by the former municipalities of Epauvillers, Epiquerez, Montenol, Montmelon, Ocourt, Saint-Ursanne and Seleute. Soubey voted not to join the merger.

Clos du Doubs can also refer to a range of the Jura folds south-west of Saint-Ursanne.
The new municipality took its name from this regional designation (which also includes Soubey).

Geography

Of this area,  or 42.9% is used for agricultural purposes, while  or 52.1% is forested.

Of the built up area, housing and buildings made up 1.2% and transportation infrastructure made up 2.0%.  Out of the forested land, 48.7% of the total land area is heavily forested and 3.4% is covered with orchards or small clusters of trees.  Of the agricultural land, 5.7% is used for growing crops and  27.5% is pastures and 9.5% is used for alpine pastures.  All the water in the municipality is flowing water.

Demographics

, 6.6% of the population are resident foreign nationals. Over the last 10 years (2000–2010) the population has changed at a rate of -2.7%. Migration accounted for -1.5%, while births and deaths accounted for -2%.

Most of the population speaks French (90.5%) as their first language, German is the second most common (6.0%) and Serbo-Croatian is the third (1.1%).

, the population was 49.6% male and 50.4% female.  The population was made up of 592 Swiss men (46.4% of the population) and 41 (3.2%) non-Swiss men.  There were 600 Swiss women (47.0%) and 43 (3.4%) non-Swiss women.

, children and teenagers (0–19 years old) make up 23.6% of the population, while adults (20–64 years old) make up 55.1% and seniors (over 64 years old) make up 21.2%.

, the construction rate of new housing units was 3.8 new units per 1000 residents.  The vacancy rate for the municipality, was 1.58%.

Historic Population
The historical population is given in the following chart:

Heritage sites of national significance
The farm house at Chez Danville 5 in Montmelon, Montvoie Castle, the Saint-Ursanne Collegiate church, the fortifications at Saint-Ursanne, the bridge over the Doubs river, and the medieval village of Saint-Ursanne are listed as Swiss heritage site of national significance.  The entire village of Saint-Ursanne and the hamlet of Montenol are part of the Inventory of Swiss Heritage Sites.

Economy
, Clos du Doubs had an unemployment rate of 2.9%.  , there were 227 people employed in the primary economic sector and about 74 businesses involved in this sector.  173 people were employed in the secondary sector and there were 12 businesses in this sector.  349 people were employed in the tertiary sector, with 46 businesses in this sector.

Of the working population, 9% used public transportation to get to work, and 47.9% used a private car.

Education
The Canton of Jura school system provides two year of non-obligatory Kindergarten, followed by six years of Primary school.  This is followed by three years of obligatory lower Secondary school where the students are separated according to ability and aptitude.  Following the lower Secondary students may attend a three or four year optional upper Secondary school followed by some form of Tertiary school or they may enter an apprenticeship.

During the 2009-10 school year, there were a total of 100 students attending 7 classes in Clos du Doubs.  There was one kindergarten class with a total of 16 students in the municipality.  The municipality had 6 primary classes and 84 students.  There are only nine Secondary schools in the canton, so all the students from Clos du Doubs attend their secondary school in another municipality.

Transportation

The municipality has a railway station, .

References

 
Municipalities of the canton of Jura
Cultural property of national significance in the canton of Jura